The 2017 Nürnberger Versicherungscup was a professional tennis tournament played on clay courts. It was the 5th edition of the tournament, and part of the 2017 WTA Tour. It took place in Nuremberg, Germany, on 22–28 May 2017.

Points and prize money

Point distribution

Prize money

Singles main draw entrants

Seeds 

 1 Rankings as of May 15, 2017.

Other entrants 
The following players received wildcards into the singles main draw:
  Katharina Gerlach
  Katharina Hobgarski
  Tatjana Maria

The following players received entry using a protected ranking:
  Ajla Tomljanović

The following players received entry from the qualifying draw:
  Marie Bouzková
  Alexandra Cadanțu
  Barbora Krejčíková
  Lena Rüffer
  Amra Sadiković
  Anna Zaja

The following player received entry as a lucky loser:
  Julia Glushko

Withdrawals 
Before the tournament
  Mona Barthel -replaced by  Maria Sakkari
  Eugenie Bouchard -replaced by  Julia Glushko
  Anastasija Sevastova -replaced by  Evgeniya Rodina
  Lesia Tsurenko -replaced by  Nao Hibino

Retirements 
  Alexandra Cadanțu
  Misaki Doi
  Monica Niculescu
  Maria Sakkari
  Yaroslava Shvedova
  Laura Siegemund

Doubles main draw entrants

Seeds 

1 Rankings as of May 15, 2017.

Other entrants 
The following pairs received wildcards into the doubles main draw:
  Annika Beck /  Anna Zaja
  Katharina Gerlach /  Katharina Hobgarski

The following pair received entry as alternates:
  Varvara Lepchenko /  Evgeniya Rodina

Withdrawals 
Before the tournament
  Monica Niculescu

During the tournament
  Misaki Doi

Champions

Singles 

  Kiki Bertens def.  Barbora Krejčíková, 6–2, 6–1

Doubles 

  Nicole Melichar /  Anna Smith def.  Kirsten Flipkens /  Johanna Larsson, 3–6, 6–3, [11–9]

External links 
 Official website

2017 WTA Tour
2017
2017 in German tennis
Nürnberger Versicherungscup